Rushyford is a village in County Durham, England. It is situated between Darlington and Durham, close to Newton Aycliffe and Chilton. The Prime Minister between 1955 and 1957, and later Earl of Avon, Anthony Eden was born in the house in 1897. The intersection of the A167 and the A689 roads is to the village's immediate north-east.

References

External links

Villages in County Durham